Fire Station No. 8, and variations, may refer to:

in Canada
No. 8 Hose Station, Toronto

in the United States
Terre Haute Fire Station No. 8, Terre Haute, Indiana, listed on the National Register of Historic Places (NRHP)
Shreveport Fire Station No. 8, Shreveport, Louisiana, NRHP-listed
Engine House No. 8 (Baltimore, Maryland), NRHP-listed
Firestation No. 8 (Salt Lake City, Utah), NRHP-listed
Engine House No. 8 (Tacoma, Washington), NRHP-listed

See also
List of fire stations